Robinsons Metro East (formerly known as Robinsons Place Metro East) is a shopping mall owned by Robinsons Malls. Robinsons Metro East is situated along Marcos Highway, located at Barangay Dela Paz in Pasig, Philippines. The mall opened on August 31, 2001, is currently the 3rd largest mall in the Philippines owned by Robinsons Malls.

History
The location was first occupied by a Uniwide Warehouse owned by Jimmy Gow's Uniwide Sales, Inc. and was subsequently sold to Gokongwei, who demolished the warehouse. Construction of the mall began in mid-1998, and Robinsons Metro East opened its doors to the public in 2001. 
The name "Metro East" refers to the fact that the mall is located in the eastern district of the Greater Manila Area, which is in the boundaries of the cities of Pasig and Marikina in Metro Manila and the municipality of Cainta in Rizal.

On September 26, 2009, the basement level of the mall was flooded as a result of Typhoon Ketsana. This, in turn, led to the closure of the entire mall. Renovation of the mall began in August 2011 and was completed in 2012.

The mall is connected to the Marikina-Pasig station of the LRT Line 2. An extension of the mall that links to the station's concourse is currently under construction.

Mall features
The main building of Metro East is one of the largest structures along Marcos Highway. The mall is a 5-level building with 4 upper levels and a basement level, features a 2-level department store, a supermarket, appliance center, Toys R Us, Timezone, and movie theaters. The mall also provides a 5-level elevated indoor carpark located on the left side of the mall.

See also
 Robinsons Galleria
 Sta. Lucia East Grand Mall
 SM City Marikina

References

Shopping malls established in 2001
Shopping malls in Pasig
Robinsons Malls